The Tor Project, Inc. is a 501(c)(3) research-education nonprofit organization based in Winchester, New Hampshire. It is founded by computer scientists Roger Dingledine, Nick Mathewson, and five others. The Tor Project is primarily responsible for maintaining software for the Tor anonymity network.

History 
The Tor Project was founded in December 2006 by computer scientists Roger Dingledine, Nick Mathewson and five others. The Electronic Frontier Foundation (EFF) acted as the Tor Project's fiscal sponsor in its early years, and early financial supporters of the Tor Project included the U.S. International Broadcasting Bureau, Internews, Human Rights Watch, the University of Cambridge, Google, and Netherlands-based Stichting NLnet.

In October 2014, the Tor Project hired the public relations firm Thomson Communications in order to improve its public image (particularly regarding the terms "Dark Net" and "hidden services") and to educate journalists about the technical aspects of Tor.

In May 2015, the Tor Project ended the Tor Cloud Service.

In December 2015, the Tor Project announced that it had hired Shari Steele, former executive director of the Electronic Frontier Foundation, as its new executive director. Roger Dingledine, who had been acting as interim executive director since May 2015, remained at the Tor Project as a director and board member. Later that month, the Tor Project announced that the Open Technology Fund would be sponsoring a bug bounty program that was coordinated by HackerOne. The program was initially invite-only and focuses on finding vulnerabilities that are specific to the Tor Project's applications.

On May 25, 2016 Tor Project employee Jacob Appelbaum stepped down from his position; this was announced on June 2 in a two-line statement by Tor. Over the following days, allegations of sexual mistreatment were made public by several people. 

On July 13, 2016, the complete board of the Tor Project – Meredith Hoban Dunn, Ian Goldberg, Julius Mittenzwei, Rabbi Rob Thomas, Wendy Seltzer, Roger Dingledine and Nick Mathewson – was replaced with Matt Blaze, Cindy Cohn, Gabriella Coleman, Linus Nordberg, Megan Price and Bruce Schneier. A new anti-harassment policy has been approved by the new board, as well as a conflicts of interest policy, procedures for submitting complaints, and an internal complaint review process. The affair continues to be controversial, with considerable dissent within the Tor community.

In 2020, due to the COVID-19 pandemic, the Tor project's core team let go of 13 employees, leaving a working staff of 22 people.

Funding
, 80% of the Tor Project's $2 million annual budget came from the United States government, with the U.S. State Department, the Broadcasting Board of Governors, and the National Science Foundation as major contributors, "to aid democracy advocates in authoritarian states". The Swedish government and other organizations provided the other 20%, including NGOs and thousands of individual sponsors. Dingledine said that the United States Department of Defense funds are more similar to a research grant than a procurement contract. Tor executive director Andrew Lewman said that even though it accepts funds from the U.S. federal government, the Tor service did not collaborate with the NSA to reveal identities of users.

In June 2016, the Tor Project received an award from Mozilla's Open Source Support program (MOSS). The award was "to significantly enhance the Tor network's metrics infrastructure so that the performance and stability of the network can be monitored and improvements made as appropriate."

Tools 
 Metrics Portal
Analytics for the Tor network, including graphs of its available bandwidth and estimated userbase. This is a great resource for researchers interested in detailed statistics about Tor.
 Nyx
a terminal (command line) application for monitoring and configuring Tor, intended for command-line enthusiasts and ssh connections. This functions much like top does for system usage, providing real time information on Tor's resource utilization and state.
 Onionoo
Web-based protocol to learn about currently running Tor relays and bridges.
 OnionShare
An open source tool that allows users to securely and anonymously share a file of any size.
 OONI (Open Observatory of Network Interference (OONI))
a global observation network, monitoring network censorship, which aims to collect high-quality data using open methodologies, using Free and Open Source Software (FL/OSS) to share observations and data about the various types, methods, and amounts of network tampering in the world.
 Orbot
Tor for Android and iOS devices, in collaboration with The Guardian Project
 Orlib
a library for use by any Android application to route Internet traffic through Orbot/Tor.
 Pluggable Transports (PT)
helps circumvent censorship. Transforms the Tor traffic flow between the client and the bridge. This way, censors who monitor traffic between the client and the bridge will see innocent-looking transformed traffic instead of the actual Tor traffic.
 Relay Search
Site providing an overview of the Tor network.
 Shadow
a discrete-event network simulator that runs the real Tor software as a plug-in. Shadow is open-source software that enables accurate, efficient, controlled, and repeatable Tor experimentation.
 Stem
Python Library for writing scripts and applications that interact with Tor.
 Tails (The Amnesic Incognito Live System)
a live CD/USB distribution preconfigured so that everything is safely routed through Tor and leaves no trace on the local system.
 Tor
free software and an open network that helps a user defend against traffic analysis, a form of network surveillance that threatens personal freedom and privacy, confidential business activities and relationships, and state security. The organization has also implemented the software in Rust named Arti.
 Tor Browser
a customization of Mozilla Firefox which uses a Tor circuit for browsing anonymously and with other features consistent with the Tor mission.
 Tor Phone
A phone that routes its network traffic through tor network. Initially based on a CopperheadOS custom ROM prototype, using Tor with Orbot and Tor Browser are supported by custom Android operating systems CalyxOS and DivestOS. GrapheneOS supports using Orbot VPN but not Tor Browser.
 TorBirdy
Torbutton for Thunderbird and related *bird forks.
 txtorcon
Python and Twisted event-based implementation of the Tor control protocol. Unit-tests, state and configuration abstractions, documentation. It is available on PyPI and in Debian.

Recognition 
In March 2011, the Tor Project received the Free Software Foundation's 2010 Award for Projects of Social Benefit. The citation read, "Using free software, Tor has enabled roughly 36 million people around the world to experience freedom of access and expression on the Internet while keeping them in control of their privacy and anonymity. Its network has proved pivotal in dissident movements in both Iran and more recently Egypt."

In September 2012, the Tor Project received the 2012 EFF Pioneer Award, along with Jérémie Zimmermann and Andrew Huang.

In November 2012, Foreign Policy magazine named Dingledine, Mathewson, and Syverson among its Top 100 Global Thinkers "for making the web safe for whistleblowers".

In 2014, Roger Dingledine, Nick Mathewson and Paul Syverson received the USENIX Test of Time Award for their paper titled "Tor: The Second-Generation Onion Router", which was published in the Proceedings of the 13th USENIX Security Symposium, August 2004.

See also 

 Tor Phone

References

External links 
 
 Old website
 List of mirror websites web.archive.org/web
 Tor Weekly News — August 27th, 2014

.
Computer science organizations
Computer security organizations
Internet privacy organizations
Organizations based in Cambridge, Massachusetts
Organizations based in Seattle
Non-profit organizations based in Massachusetts
501(c)(3) organizations
Scientific organizations established in 2006
2006 establishments in Massachusetts
Science and technology in Massachusetts
Tor onion services